KR-völlur is a football stadium in Reykjavík, Iceland.

It is currently used mostly for football matches and has been the home stadium of Knattspyrnufélag Reykjavíkur since 1984. The stadium holds about 2,700 people and is located at Kaplaskjólsvegur in West Reykjavík.

Stats
Size: 105 x 68 m
Opening game: 18 July 1951 KR - Vålerenga 3 - 2
Record attendance: 26 September 1998 - 5,400 KR - ÍBV
Average attendance 2007 season: 1,873 people

Gallery

References

External links
KR-völlur at Nordicstadiums.com

Football venues in Iceland
Knattspyrnufélag Reykjavíkur
Sports venues in Reykjavík
Sports venues completed in 1951